Musafir ibn Ibrahim II (died 1062) was the last Sallarid ruler of Dailam (1050–1062). He was the son of Ibrahim II ibn Marzuban II, and brother of his predecessor Justan II ibn Ibrahim II. Not much is known about him. In 1062, the Seljuq ruler Tughril marched towards Musafir's capital Tarom, where he made Musafir acknowledge his authority and pay him 100,000 dinars in tribute. Shortly afterwards, the Ismailis seized Tarom and killed Musafir, putting an end to the Sallarid dynasty.

Sources
 

1067 deaths
Year of birth unknown
11th-century Iranian people
Sallarid dynasty